Kim Young-dae (born March 2, 1996) is a South Korean actor. He first gained recognition for the MBC high school drama Extraordinary You (2019). More recently, he appeared in the SBS television series The Penthouse: War In Life (2020) and the KBS2 television series Cheat on Me If You Can (2020). Kim took on his first leading role in tvN television series Sh**ting Stars (2022), and later appeared in sageuk The Forbidden Marriage (2022-23).

Career 
Kim made his debut in 2017 through the web drama Secret Crushes: Special Edition aired on WHYNOT MEDIA. followed by web drama Office Watch 2, Just Too. Bored, What to Do with You, It's Okay To Be Sensitive, Office Watch 3  etc..

In 2018, Kim made his acting debut on television. From the drama Drama Special episode The Time Left Between Us broadcast on KBS2.

In 2019, Kim starred in the drama Item as younger Ju Ji-hoon and aired on MBC. Later, Kim made a special appearance in the drama Welcome to Waikiki 2. and Kim was part of the main cast for the MBC television series Extraordinary You. On October 2, Kim appeared on MBC's "Idol Radio" together with other cast members Kim Hye-yoon, Rowoon, and Lee Na-eun.

On October 17, Kim modelled for "SONGZIO HOMME", designer Song Zio's show at the 2019 Hera Seoul Fashion Week at Dongdaemun Design Plaza in Seoul.

In 2020, Kim appeared in the drama When the Weather Is Fine aired on JTBC. It was followed by the drama Cheat on Me If You Can  aired on KBS2 As a result, Kim won a Netizen Award, Actor at the KBS Drama Awards. and the drama The Penthouse: War in Life aired on SBS. With this work, Kim has gained more recognition and has the opportunity to be nominated for SBS Drama Awards Best New Actor category and 57th Baeksang Arts Awards category Best New Actor – Television.

In 2021, Kim made a special appearances in True Beauty and Undercover. 

In 2022, Kim appeared as a muse at the '2022 F/W Paris Collection' digital fashion show 'SONGZIO'. Later in April, Kim starred in the tvN drama Sh**ting Stars alongside Lee Sung-kyung, which marked his first lead role. Later in October, Kim has announced that he will be holding a "Fall in Love YoungDae ASIA TOUR" fan meeting in Thailand, Indonesia, and the Philippines.

Philanthropy 
In December 2022, Kim made a donation to support the children in the 2021 group shelter, and in 2022 he continued warmly by donating to Big Issue Korea for the Underprivileged.

Filmography

Television series

Web series

Television show

Music videos

Theater

Ambassadorship 
 International Environment City Seo-gu (2021)

Awards and nominations

Notes

References

External links 
 
 
 
 

Living people
South Korean male television actors
21st-century South Korean male actors
South Korean male musical theatre actors
South Korean male stage actors
South Korean male web series actors
1996 births